County Road 7 is a  road in Vestland county, Norway. The road runs from Trengereid in the municipality of Bergen to Kollanes in the municipality of Voss.

The route branches off from European route E16 and passes through the Trengereid Valley to Samnanger before crossing mountainous territory east to Norheimsund. It then continues along the north side of the Hardanger Fjord through Øystese and Ålvik and the north side of the Granvin Fjord before meeting Norwegian National Road 13 in the municipality of Voss.

History

The section of the road through the Toka Gorge was laid out around 1890; construction began on it in 1903 and it was opened in 1907. Large parts of the road were carved out by hand while the workers hung on ropes against the sheer mountainside. This method was used because the road lacks any natural foundation. A new route with four tunnels was opened in the 1960s. These are the Snauhaugen Tunnel, Hansagjel Tunnel, Tokagjel Tunnel, and Fossagjel Tunnel. On December 21, 2009 the Norwegian Directorate for Cultural Heritage protected the road through the Toka Gorge along with 39 other routes as part of the National Protection Plan for Roads, Bridges, and Road-Related Cultural Heritage.

Before January 1, 2010 the route was part of Norwegian National Road 7. Before 1992 the route from Bergen to Granvin via Nesttun was part of the former European route E68.

In 2015, the section of the route between Folkedal and Haukanes in the Granvin Fjord, which was exposed to landslides, was improved with a new  section including the  Folkedal Tunnel. The construction cost NOK 274 million.

National Tourist Route
The section of the road between Steinsdal Falls in Kvam and Granvin has been designated as the Hardanger National Tourist Route together with the road section from Jondal to Utne on County Road 550 and the section from Låte Falls to Kinsarvik along National Road 13.

References

External links
Statens vegvesen – trafikkmeldinger Fv7 (Traffic Information: County Road 7)

007
Voss
Kvam
Samnanger
Transport in Bergen